Banksia nana, commonly known as dwarf dryandra, is a species of shrub that is endemic to a small area in the south-west of Western Australia. It has underground stems, pinnatipartite leaves with sharply-pointed lobes, pale green or yellow flowers and broadly egg-shaped follicles.

Description
Banksia nana is a shrub with short, hairy, underground stems and a small lignotuber. There are between ten and thirty-five sharply-pointed lobes on each side of the leaves.

Taxonomy and naming
This species was first formally described in 1855 by Carl Meissner who gave it the name Dryandra nana and published the description in Hooker's Journal of Botany and Kew Garden Miscellany from specimens collected by James Drummond. The specific epithet (nana) is a Latin word meaning "dwarf". In 2007 Austin Mast and Kevin Thiele transferred all dryandras to the genus Banksia and renamed this species Banksia nana.

Distribution and habitat
Banksia nana grows in kwongan on low hills near Badgingarra in the Geraldton Sandplains and  Swan Coastal Plain biogeographic regions.

Conservation status
This banksia is classified as "Priority Three" by the Government of Western Australia Department of Parks and Wildlife, meaning that it is poorly known and known from only a few locations but is not under imminent threat.

References

 

nana
Plants described in 1855
Taxa named by Carl Meissner